Johann Wilhelm, Duke of Saxe-Jena (Jena, 28 March 1675 – Jena, 4 November 1690), was a duke of Saxe-Jena.

He was the youngest but sole surviving son of Bernhard II, Duke of Saxe-Jena by his wife Marie Charlotte, daughter of Henry de La Trémoille, 3rd Duke of Thouars, 2nd Duke of La Tremoille, and Prince of Talmond and Taranto.

Life
When only three years old (1678) he succeeded his father as Duke of Saxe-Jena. In accordance with the testamentary instructions of his father, his uncle, Duke Johann Ernst II of Saxe-Weimar assumed his guardianship and the regency of the duchy; when he died in 1683, another uncle, Duke Johann Georg I of Saxe-Eisenach, assumed the regency. Three years later (1686), the new regent also died, and  his cousin (son of the late Duke Johann Ernst II) and brother-in-law (he was married to his eldest and only surviving sister, Charlotte Marie) Duke Wilhelm Ernst of Saxe-Weimar was appointed to the regency.

As Johann Wilhelm lived only fifteen years and failed to reach adulthood, he never governed. With his death the line of the Dukes of Saxe-Jena had become extinct, and the duchy was divided between Saxe-Weimar and Saxe-Eisenach.

1675 births
1690 deaths
House of Wettin
Dukes of Saxe-Jena
17th-century German people
People of Byzantine descent
People from Jena
Royalty and nobility who died as children